Allan Jennings (born 23 March 1959) is a former Australian rules footballer who played for the Footscray Football Club in the Victorian Football League (VFL).

Notes

External links 
		

Living people
1959 births
Australian rules footballers from Victoria (Australia)
Western Bulldogs players
Traralgon Football Club players